Mike Kunkel is a cartoonist known, among other things, for his work on Billy Batson and the Magic of Shazam! and for his creator-owned Herobear and the Kid, for which he has won two Eisner awards.

References

External links 

 http://kunkelshazam.blogspot.com/
 http://www.comicbookresources.com/?page=article&id=23981
 http://www.sequentialtart.com/archive/june01/kunkel.shtml
 http://www.animationartconservation.com/herobear-and-the-kid.html

Living people
Year of birth missing (living people)